Demenyovo is a rural locality (a selo) and the administrative center of Demenyovskoye Rural Settlement, Chernushinsky District, Perm Krai, Russia. The population was 769 as of 2010. There are 21 streets.

Geography 
Demenyovo is located 27 km north of Chernushka (the district's administrative centre) by road. Gari is the nearest rural locality.

References 

Rural localities in Chernushinsky District